Kim Tibbs is an American professional musician and songwriter, originally from Huntsville, Alabama, United States. She is a current soul music recording artist under Expansion Records in London.

Her album, Kim, was released in 2017.

References

Year of birth missing (living people)
Living people
American soul singers
American women singer-songwriters
American singer-songwriters
21st-century American women